Ceol (also known as Ceola or Ceolric) was King of Wessex from 592 to 597.

Ceol was the son of Cutha (or Cuthwulf), the son of Cynric of Wessex. He reigned from either 591 or 592 to 597. According to the Anglo-Saxon Chronicle, he began his reign in 591, but it was only in the following year that he drove out his uncle Ceawlin in a battle at Woden's Barrow in Wiltshire, thus denying the throne to the rightful heir, Ceawlin's son Cuthwine. Upon his death the throne passed to his brother Ceolwulf. Because his son Cynegils was presumably too young to inherit the throne, it was given to the brother, as was probably the custom among the Saxons.  In 1967 Wright and Jackson found a stone at Wroxeter in a Sub-Roman context (dating to c. 460 – 475 AD[4]) with the inscription CUNORIX MACUS MAQVI COLINE, which translates as "Cunorix ('Hound-king' = Cynric) son of Maqui-Coline ('Son-of-Holly'), both of which are regarded as Irish personal names.

The Ceolian line
Ceol was the founding member of a sub-house of the House of Wessex which would rule Wessex from 591 – 645, 648 – 674 and from 676 – 685, comprising Ceol, Ceolwulf, Cynegils, Cenwalh, Seaxburh and Centwine. Coenwulf and Ceolwulf I of Mercia are also believed to be descendants of Ceol, meaning that the Ceolian line flourished for at least three centuries after its founder's death, and possibly longer. (See House of Wessex family tree.)

Notes

External links
 

West Saxon monarchs
6th-century English monarchs
House of Wessex